Hillview or Hill View may refer to:

Places

Australia 
 Hillview, Sutton Forest, New South Wales
 Hillview, Queensland

Canada 
 Hillview, Edmonton, Alberta
 Hillview, Newfoundland and Labrador
 Hillview, Ontario

Ireland 
Hillview, Waterford

Malaysia 
Taman Hillview, Selangor

Singapore 
Hillview, Singapore

United Kingdom 
 Hill View, Bournemouth, England

United States 
 Hillview, Illinois
 Hillview, Kentucky
 The Hillview, a historical building in Hollywood, California

Education
Hill View Academy, in Almondbury, West Yorkshire, England
Hillview College in Tunapuna, Trinidad and Tobago
Hillview High School in Pretoria, South Africa
Hillview High School (Orange County, California), United States
Hillview School for Girls in Tonbridge, Kent, United Kingdom